Patrick & Henry Community College (P&HCC or Patrick & Henry) is a public community college in Henry County, Virginia. It was founded in 1962 as part of the University of Virginia's School of General Studies. The college became an independent two-year college in 1964 and part of the Virginia Community College System in 1971.  Accredited by the Commission on Colleges of the Southern Association of Colleges and Schools, PHCC offers a variety of associate degree programs as well as certification and career studies programs.

In July 2021, the Virginia State Board of Community Colleges changed names for local institutions named after people who owned slaves or advocated racist policies such as school segregation.  The board allowed the college to change its name to Patrick & Henry Community College. Instead of venerating Patrick Henry, the first and sixth Governor of Virginia, the new name honors Patrick County and Henry County, two areas the institution serves.

Campus

Classes were originally held in the old Northside Elementary School in Martinsville, Virginia before they were moved to the present campus.  The first building, Francis T. West Hall, was completed in 1969 and served as an administration building.  The Learning Resource Center, which houses the tutoring centers and the Lester Library, was completed in 1971.  Five additional buildings have since been added, the last finished in 1999, and the entire campus underwent significant renovations in 2010.  The campus is situated on  approximately three miles north of the City of Martinsville.

In addition to the main campus, PHCC has additional satellite locations, including workforce development centers in Martinsville and nearby Stuart and the Virginia Motorsports Training Center, a reflection of the community's connection to NASCAR through Martinsville Speedway.

Academics
Degree programs at Patrick & Henry Community College include associate degrees and certificate and career studies programs, as well as nontraditional programs (such as industrial certifications and "personal enrichment" courses) and transfer agreements with other colleges and universities throughout the region.

Athletics 
The Patrick & Henry Community College Patriots compete in the Carolinas Junior College Conference of the NJCAA's Division II. men's sports include baseball, basketball, soccer, golf, and track & field; women's sports include basketball, softball, soccer, golf, volleyball, and track & field. PHCC also hosts club sports such as gold & blue dance team and Esports.

Notable alumni
Alison Parker, journalist for WDBJ who was killed alongside camera man Adam Ward during a live on-air interview.

Keven Wood, American professional stock car racing driver

References

External links

Virginia Community College System
Universities and colleges accredited by the Southern Association of Colleges and Schools
Education in Henry County, Virginia
Educational institutions established in 1962
1962 establishments in Virginia